Dehlor (also Romanized as Deh Lor and Dehlar; also known as Deh-ī-Lūr) is a village in Khezel-e Gharbi Rural District, in the Central District of Kangavar County, Kermanshah Province, Iran. At the 2006 census, its population was 1,047, in 241 families.

References 

Populated places in Kangavar County